The 1994 Hungarian Grand Prix was a Formula One motor race held on 14 August 1994 at the Hungaroring, Mogyoród, Pest, Hungary. It was the tenth race of the 1994 Formula One World Championship.

The 77-lap race was won from pole position by Michael Schumacher, driving a Benetton-Ford. Schumacher's Drivers' Championship rival, Damon Hill, finished second in a Williams-Renault, with Jos Verstappen third in the other Benetton-Ford after Martin Brundle suffered an electrical failure in his McLaren-Peugeot on the final lap. Brundle was partnered for this race by McLaren tester Philippe Alliot, deputising for a suspended Mika Häkkinen.

The win, Schumacher's seventh of the season, meant that his lead over Hill in the Drivers' Championship stood at 31 points with six races remaining.

Weekend report before qualifying 

Benetton and McLaren were both in trouble with issues found by the FIA after the German Grand Prix. Benetton were troubled with the result of Jos Verstappen's fiery pit stop at Hockenheimring, which was caused by the team removing a filter from the fuelling system. The FIA believed it allowed a piece of debris to become lodged within a valve of the nozzle that caused the fuel to spill out onto the bodywork. It was highly criticised by the FIA with the design of the fuel rig, as to which the FIA had required all teams to use with the regulation changes. McLaren were troubled with the result of Mika Hakkinen receiving a one race ban for causing a crash on the first lap of the German Grand Prix and was replaced by Philippe Alliot who made his first grand prix since the French Grand Prix the previous year but had spun off the circuit during first practice which left to take over Brundle's car. This did not bring much satisfaction for the head of Peugeot engineering and fellow Frenchman Jean-Pierre Jabouille, who had been actively campaigning the McLaren management to replace Brundle with Alliot for several months.

Qualifying 

The front row was locked out by the championship contenders Michael Schumacher and Damon Hill with Schumacher half a second quicker than Hill with the Benetton of Schumacher also quickest during the Sunday morning warm-up. With the top ten being completed by Coulthard third in the other Williams, Berger fourth for Ferrari as Berger's teammate Alesi could do not better than 13th due to handling issues behind Jos Verstappen's Benetton but also ahead of Alliot's McLaren who was 14th (which left McLaren separated by eight places), Katayama fifth for Tyrrell, Brundle sixth for McLaren, Eddie Irvine seventh for Jordan, Frentzen eighth for Sauber, Panis was ninth for Ligier & Rubens Barrichello completing the top ten in the other Jordan.

Race 
Despite being on the clean side of the track, Schumacher got off to a bad start compared to Hill's Williams but managed to brake later than Hill allowing him to retake the lead ahead of Hill, Coulthard, Berger, Katayama, and Brundle through turn 1. The Jordans of Irvine and Barrichello were quick and surpassed Brundle and Katayama, but the Jordan teammates collided at the second turn and took off Katayama as well forcing all three drivers to immediately retire. Alesi was able to pass Panis for sixth. Nothing changed in the order after the first round of pit stops, but eventually there was action behind as Berger stalled which left him to drop behind Brundle, Alesi, and Verstappen. Ferrari's bad luck continued as Alesi's engine failed on lap 59 and left oil on the track which caused David Coulthard to spin off and crash out of third place into the wall a lap later as the other Ferrari of Gerhard Berger also retired with engine failure on lap 73. Martin Brundle stopped on the last lap with an electrical failure, denying him of a podium and handing his place to Jos Verstappen who was just behind him. Michael Schumacher claimed his seventh victory of the season ahead of Damon Hill, teammate Jos Verstappen, Martin Brundle, Mark Blundell for Tyrrell and Olivier Panis scoring sixth for Ligier.

Classification

Qualifying

Race

Championship standings after the race

Drivers' Championship standings

Constructors' Championship standings

References

Hungarian Grand Prix
Hungarian Grand Prix
Grand Prix
Hungarian Grand Prix